The 2019–20 PFC Krylia Sovetov Samara season was the club's second season back in the Russian Premier League, the highest tier of football in Russia, since their relegation at the end of the 2016–17 season.

Season events
On 17 March, the Russian Premier League postponed all league fixtures until April 10 due to the COVID-19 pandemic.

On 1 April, the Russian Football Union extended the suspension of football until 31 May.

On 15 May, the Russian Football Union announced that the Russian Premier League season would resume on 21 June.

On 18 May, Spartak Moscow announced that they had exercised their option to purchase Aleksandr Sobolev from Krylia Sovetov.

On 28 June, manager Miodrag Božović left the club by mutual consent, with Andrei Talalayev being announced as his replacement later the same day.

On 16 July, the Russian Premier League announced that the final game of the season between Krylia Sovetov and Sochi would not take place due to an outbreak of COVID-19 within the Sochi squad. On 23 July, the RFU assigned Krylia Sovetov a 3–0 victory over Sochi in their cancelled game.

Squad

Out on loan

Transfers

In

Loans in

Out

Loans out

Released

Trial

Friendlies

Competitions

Premier League

Results by round

Results

League table

Russian Cup

Squad statistics

Appearances and goals

|-
|colspan="14"|Players away from the club on loan:

|-
|colspan="14"|Players who appeared for Krylia Sovetov but left during the season:

|}

Goal scorers

Clean sheet

Disciplinary record

References

PFC Krylia Sovetov Samara seasons
Krylia Sovetov